Chromosome 9 open reading frame 156 is a protein that in humans is encoded by the C9orf156 gene. The gene is also known as NAP1 and HSPC219; the orthologue in mice is 5830415F09Rik.

Model organisms
				
Model organisms have been used in the study of C9orf156 function. A conditional knockout mouse line, called 5830415F09Riktm1a(EUCOMM)Wtsi was generated as part of the International Knockout Mouse Consortium program — a high-throughput mutagenesis project to generate and distribute animal models of disease to interested scientists — at the Wellcome Trust Sanger Institute.

Male and female animals underwent a standardized phenotypic screen to determine the effects of deletion. Twenty four tests were carried out on mutant mice, but no significant abnormalities were observed.

References

Further reading 
 

Human proteins
Genes mutated in mice